This is a list of African-American newspapers that have been published in Washington, D.C.  It includes both current and historical newspapers.

Although Washington was home to abolitionist papers prior to the American Civil War (1861-1865), the first known newspaper published by and for African Americans in the District of Columbia was the New Era, which Frederick Douglass launched in 1870.

Notable newspapers in Washington today include the Washington Afro-American and Washington Informer.

Newspapers

See also 
List of African-American newspapers and media outlets
List of African-American newspapers in Maryland
List of African-American newspapers in Virginia
List of newspapers in Washington, D.C.

Works cited

References 

Newspapers
Washington, D.C.
African-American
African-American newspapers